The 1924 Saint Mary's Saints football team was an American football team that represented Saint Mary's College of California during the 1924 college football season. In their fourth season under head coach Slip Madigan, the Gaels compiled an 8–1 record and outscored their opponents by a combined total of 205 to 50. The Gaels' victories including a 14–10 besting of the USC Trojans, and the sole defeat was by a 17–7 score against a California team that had been undefeated for more than four years with four national championships.

The 1924 St. Mary's team included halfbacks "Ducky" Grant and Leo Rooney, fullback and team captain Red Strader, and center Larry Bettencourt.

Schedule

References

Saint Mary's
Saint Mary's Gaels football seasons
Saint Mary's Saints football